Lugman Bezzat (born 17 February 1997), is a Dutch professional footballer who last played as a winger for VVV.

References

External links
 

1997 births
Living people
Dutch footballers
Association football forwards
Eerste Divisie players
VVV-Venlo players
Footballers from Venlo